The Coleford Railway was a railway company that constructed a short railway from near Monmouth to Coleford, close to the Forest of Dean. The company was sponsored by the Great Western Railway. It was built on part of the course of the Monmouth Railway, a horse-operated plateway, and it was intended that its primary business would be the conveyance of minerals and forest products from the Forest of Dean.

The line was built on the standard gauge and was 5 miles 20 chains in length. It opened on 1 September 1883, and was worked by the GWR, which soon absorbed it.

It was never commercially successful, and it closed on 1 January 1917.

History
The Forest of Dean was rich in minerals, in particular coal and iron, and some tin and stone. Mineral extraction had been practised for centuries, and the Free Miners had certain exclusive rights. However this militated against the involvement of larger external companies and modernisation and industrialisation were discouraged. Coupled with the poor communications in the Forest before the advent of modern railways, this led to high costs and poor competitiveness.

Coleford was an important location as a focal point for western access to the minerals of the Forest of Dean. However the construction of the Coleford Railway, from Monmouth, came late after a series of other initiatives.

Antecedent railways

Monmouth Railway

A number of short tramways were built to connect individual mines to onward transport, and in 1810 the Monmouth Railway was authorised by Act of Parliament to build a plateway between mines east of Coleford and May Hill at Monmouth. Powers were given to cross the River Wye at Monmouth and at Redbrook, although these were never taken up. The Monmouth Railway was to be a 3 ft 6in gauge plateway, on which ordinary wagons with plain wheels could run. The Company would not itself operate trains; it was to be a toll road, taking a toll charge from independent carriers who used it. It opened in stages between 1812 and 1817.

There were lengthy branches east of Coleford, serving collieries and pits. West of Coleford there were a tunnel and two rope-worked inclined planes, and the line terminated at Redbrook, adjacent to the River Wye, and at May Hill, on the east side of the Wye at Monmouth.

Coleford, Monmouth, Usk & Pontypool Railway

A group of promoters formulated a plan to build what became the Coleford, Monmouth, Usk & Pontypool Railway (CMU&PR); it was to run from Coleford through Monmouth to near Pontypool, joining the Newport, Abergavenny and Hereford Railway at Little Mill. This would give a more convenient railway connection for mineral traffic from the Forest of Dean to the ironworks of Nantyglo, Ebbw Vale, and Dowlais. The company planned to acquire the portion of the Monmouth Railway between Coleford and Monmouth, and convert it to edge railway operation.

The Coleford, Monmouth, Usk and Pontypool Railway Act secured royal assent on 20 August 1853. Construction at the west end took place promptly, and the line from Little Mill to Usk opened for traffic on 2 June 1856. The Newport, Abergavenny and Hereford Railway worked the line.

The eastern section posed more problems, with tunnels at Usk and Monmouth, and a large river bridge at Monmouth. On 12 October 1857 the line was completed as far as the Troy station at Monmouth. From that date the company worked its own trains, using two locomotives hired in from the Newport, Abergavenny and Hereford Railway.

The construction had been expensive, and the Company reconsidered the likely cost of the conversion of the Monmouth Railway. As a 3 ft 6in gauge horse-operated plateway, there were numerous sharp curves, unsuitable for locomotive operation, and the tunnel was of a small profile. The plateway permanent way would have required conversion for full railway operation with locomotives. After considerable deliberation the CMU&PR decided to build the river bridge at Monmouth (itself an expensive undertaking) but to make an interchange with the Monmouth Railway at Wyesham, transshipping there, but not proceeding further.

The bridge and extension to Wyesham were opened on 1 July 1861.

West Midland Railway

Meanwhile the Newport, Abergavenny and Hereford Railway was collaborating with neighbouring concerns, and on 1 July 1860 an Act of Parliament was passed forming the West Midland Railway from them. This gave access to mineral resources and to industrial areas requiring them. The Coleford, Monmouth, Usk and Pontypool Railway was already reliant on the CMU&PR, and now on the larger West Midland Railway, and a lease was agreed (for 1,000 years) of the CMU&PR to the West Midland Railway from 1 July 1861; it was ratified by Act of Parliament of 22 July 1861.

The West Midland Railway had no appetite for proceeding with the conversion of the Monmouth Railway, and the matter remained unchanged: the portion of the Monmouth Railway west of Coleford was the (leasehold) property of the West Midland Railway but the whole Monmouth Railway concern continued to be run by its own managers, with whatever traffic was available being interchanged (and physically transshipped) at Wyesham.

The West Midland Railway was itself amalgamated with the Great Western Railway in 1863.

Wye Valley Railway

The Wye Valley Railway had opened on 1 November 1876, from a junction with the Great Western Railway main line near Chepstow, to Monmouth Troy. In fact the Monmouth termination was at Wyesham, at the end of the Coleford, Monmouth, Usk and Pontypool Railway line, now an integral part of the GWR system. Wyesham was not a junction at this stage, merely an interchange point with the plateway line of the Monmouth Railway. Wye Valley Railway trains gained access to Monmouth Troy station using the stub of the CMU&PR line, and crossed the River Wye using that company's viaduct.

Coleford Railway
The primitive technology of the Monmouth Railway was a source of continuing frustration to its users, and in 1870 definite steps were taken towards providing a modern railway to the town. In fact the Severn and Wye Railway had its main line not far to the east, although difficult terrain intervened. The Severn and Wye Company submitted a parliamentary bill in the 1872 session to convert its Milkwall Tramway to railway operation and extend it to Coleford.

At the same time a nominally independent group, in fact sponsored by the Great Western Railway, proposed a branch line from the Wye Valley Railway at Wyesham to Coleford. The GWR already owned the portion of the former Monmouth Railway as far as Coleford, and now the Coleford Railway would convert it to modern standards.

Both the Severn and Wye Railway and the Coleford Railway schemes were authorised on the same day: the Coleford Railway was thus incorporated by Act of Parliament of 18 July 1872, with authorised capital of £66,000. It was to be 5 miles 20 chains in length.

Davis says a second Act was required:

"An Act of July 18, 1872 authorised the construction of the Coleford Railway from Wyesham to Coleford. These powers were not exercised, and the Coleford Branch was built... under an Act of 1875."

The Coleford Railway followed the route of the Monmouth Tramroad for part of its route, but included several deviations to eliminate the sharp curves that were unsuitable for main line railway operation. The railway included four tunnels over its route, but there was only one intermediate station, at Newland.

Opening
The process of conversion was not rapid, and it was not until 1 September 1883 that the branch opened for traffic. It was worked by the GWR from the outset.

The Coleford Railway was a small and unprofitable company that had been sponsored by the Great Western Railway and worked by it. Independence was an illusion, and the concern was vested in the Great Western Railway from 1 July 1884, ratified by Act of Parliament of 7 August 1884.

Arrowsmith gave a detailed description of the line:

The passenger service consisted of two trains each way in the morning, and two in the afternoon Mondays to Fridays, some of these running as mixed trains. The journey took around 20 minutes using four-wheeled carriages.

The Severn and Wye Railway station at Coleford had been opened in 1875. The two stations, of the Severn and Wye and the Coleford Railway, were adjacent and there were shared sidings for the transfer of goods wagons, but through running was not possible; in fact a complex backshunt was involved to work vehicles through.

On the opening of the Coleford branch, the GWR immediately cancelled through goods rates from Coleford to GWR stations via the Severn and Wye line.

Closure
Throughout its operating life the line never really fulfilled the hopes expected of it and it was closed on 1 January 1917. Shortly afterwards most of the track was lifted and the rails were taken to France in connection with the exigencies of World War I. Whitecliff Quarry continued to be productive, and its output was conveyed over 71 chains of the Coleford branch, and through the sidings at Coleford, requiring four reversals, and on to the former Severn and Wye system.

After the main railway operations had ceased, the tunnel at Newland was taken over for the cultivation of mushrooms. Ammunition was stored here during World War II, and Newland station was requisitioned by the Air Ministry as their local headquarters with the signal box becoming the guardroom. In connection with this military presence the two tunnels at Redbrook were also used as ammunition stores after the ends of both structures had been securely bricked up.

The line from Whitecliff Quarry to Coleford continued in use for the transportation of limestone until 1967, after which date there was no railway activity on the line.

Today's remnants
The signal box and goods shed at the GWR station at Coleford has been converted into a museum dedicated to the railways of the Forest of Dean and the Great Western Railway: see Coleford Great Western Railway Museum.

Topography

Station list
 Coleford; opened 1 September 1883; closed 1 January 1917;
 Newland; opened 1 September 1883; closed 1 January 1917; also known as Cherry Orchard
 Wyesham Junction; convergence with the Wye Valley line.

Gradients
The line descended without a break from Coleford to Monmouth; typical gradients were 1 in 42 with only short sections of more moderate gradient.

Further reading
Map in F W Arrowsmith, A Description of the Monmouth to Coleford Branch, written at the time of opening, in Thomas B Peacock, Musing on Railways, Four Essays, 1948, T B Peacock

References

Rail transport in Gloucestershire
Forest of Dean
Railway lines opened in 1883
Railway companies disestablished in 1884
Standard gauge railways in England
Coleford, Gloucestershire
Monmouth, Wales